In probability theory, a random recursive tree is a rooted tree chosen uniformly at random from the recursive trees with a given number of vertices.

Definition and generation
These trees are unordered, in the sense that there is no distinguished ordering of the children of each vertex. In a random recursive tree, all such trees are equally likely.

If each of the choices is uniform and independent of the other choices, the resulting tree will be a random recursive tree.

Properties
With high probability, the longest path from the root to the leaf of an -vertex random recursive tree has length .
The maximum number of children of any vertex, i.e., degree, in the tree is, with high probability, .
The expected distance of the th vertex from the root is the th harmonic number, from which it follows by linearity of expectation that the sum of all root-to-vertex path lengths is, with high probability, .

Applications
 lists several applications of random recursive trees in modeling phenomena including disease spreading, pyramid schemes, the evolution of languages, and the growth of computer networks.

References

Trees (graph theory)
Random graphs